Baolia is a genus of flowering plants belonging to the family Amaranthaceae.

Its native range is Northern China.

Species:

Baolia bracteata

References

Chenopodioideae
Amaranthaceae genera